Tigran Arakelyan (born 1987) is an Armenian-American conductor, currently the music director of the Northwest Mahler Festival and Port Townsend Symphony Orchestra.   Since 2022, Arakelyan is the executive director of Music Works Northwest in Bellevue, WA. 

Arakelyan held conducting positions with the California Philharmonic Orchestra, Los Angeles Youth Orchestra and youth orchestras in Bainbridge Island, Federal Way and Bremerton.  He played alongside James Galway and the Los Angeles Philharmonic during Galway's induction to the Hollywood Bowl Hall of Fame. Arakelyan conducted regional premieres by Paul Hindemith, James Cohn,  Keith Jarrett and Iosif Andriasov. He is a recipient of awards from The American Prize, Global Music Awards and AGBU Performing Arts Fellowship.

He has a Doctorate of Musical Arts from the University of Washington and a M.Mus from California State University, Northridge. His musical studies are with Ludovic Morlot, John Barcellona and Paul Taub. Arakelyan participated in masterclasses and festivals at the Conductors Guild, Pierre Monteux School, Idyllwild Music Festival and the Seattle Flute Society. In masterclasses he has worked with David Effron, Stephen Preston, and others. He played in the Los Angeles Junior Philharmonic Orchestra.

Arakelyan has done podcast interviews with George Walker, Evelyn Glennie, David Harrington from Kronos Quartet, Christian McBride, Mark O'Connor, Sharon Isbin, Richard Stoltzman, Christopher Theofanidis, Vijay Iyer, Yolanda Kondonassis, Diane Schuur,  Øystein Baadsvik, Ransom Wilson, Roger Bobo, Eugene Izotov, Martin Kuuskmann, Ran Blake, Jaime Martin, Melia Watras, Martin Bresnick, JoAnn Falletta, Kris Kwapis, Alphonso Johnson, Jovino Santos Neto, Leslie Mándoki, Joseph Young, Wadada Leo Smith, Robert Dick & many others.

References

General references

External links

Date of birth missing (living people)
Living people
Armenian conductors (music)
Armenian classical musicians
American people of Armenian descent
1987 births
California State University, Northridge alumni
University of Washington College of Arts and Sciences alumni